Allen J. Grubman is an American entertainment lawyer.

Early life
Grubman was born in and grew up in Crown Heights, in Brooklyn, New York.  He attended City College of New York, where he earned a BBA  While attending Brooklyn Law School, where he earned a J.D., he worked in the mailroom at the William Morris Agency and as a CBS page.

Career 
After graduating from Brooklyn Law School in 1967, he wrote various lawyers asking for a job.  When an attorney named Walter Hofer met with him, he recalled: "I didn't know what to say, so I tried to get him to like me. I said, 'I really want to work for you, but I don't come from a very wealthy family, so I can't afford to pay you very much to hire me.'"  Hofer hired him to work in his music law firm as an associate for $125-per-week ($ in current dollar terms).

Grubman subsequently started his own business. In the 1970s, he signed obscure disco artists who later became popular, and thereafter he signed a number of stars.  Grubman started a firm with fellow Brooklyn Law School graduates Paul Schindler ('71) and Arthur Indursky ('67) in 1974, and upon Schindler's departure the firm was known as Grubman Indursky & Shire.  In 1982 he landed one of his biggest clients, Bruce Springsteen. His clients include superstars and top record companies and their executives. In 2005, the firm had grown to 30 attorneys.
 
In 1992 Business Week reported that Grubman was considered "the most powerful lawyer in the music business."  In 2001, Newsweek called him "perhaps the music industry's wealthiest and most powerful attorney".

His clients have included Springsteen, Madonna, U2, John Mellencamp, Rod Stewart, Sean "Puffy" Combs, Luther Vandross, Elton John, Jennifer Lopez, Mariah Carey, and Andrew Lloyd Webber.

In May 2020, the hacker group REvil claimed to have hacked and downloaded a huge amount data from Grubman's law firm, and demanded $42 million ransom to prevent release of data.
In 2022, he was inducted into the Rock and Roll Hall of Fame in the Ahmet Ertegun Award category for negotiating ground-breaking long-term agreements for his clients that allow them to maintain creative control of their work.

Family

After graduating from law school, he met his first wife, Yvette Fischer Grubman.  She divorced him in 1988 after 19 years of marriage, and died of cancer in 2001 at the age of 58.

They had two daughters, their elder being Lizzie Grubman, a celebrity publicist.  Their younger daughter Jennifer Grubman Rothenberg holds a BA from Boston University and a J.D. from the Benjamin N. Cardozo School of Law, is President of Innovative Philanthropy, and is a member of the Board of Directors of Cardozo Law School.

Grubman remarried in 1991, at the New York Public Library.  His second wife is Debbie Grubman (née Haimoff), a Manhattan real-estate broker. He is Jewish.

References

Living people
Brooklyn Law School alumni
People from Crown Heights, Brooklyn
American entertainment lawyers
New York (state) lawyers
City College of New York alumni
Year of birth missing (living people)
20th-century American Jews
21st-century American Jews
20th-century American lawyers
21st-century American lawyers